This list of cantilever bridges ranks the world's cantilever bridges by the length of their main span. A cantilever bridge is a bridge built using cantilevers: structures that project horizontally into space, supported on only one end.

Completed cantilever bridges
This list only includes bridges that carry automobiles or trains. It
does not include suspension bridges, cable-stayed bridges, footbridges or pipeline bridges. The span must be 750 feet (229 m) or over to be included in the list.
 Note: Click on each bridge's rank to go to the bridge's website. The list may be incomplete. Sourced additions are welcomed.''

See also
 List of cantilever bridges
 List of spans

References

List
Cantilever bridges
Cantilever bridges
Bridges, cantilever
Lists of construction records
Bridges, cantilever